My Little Society is the third EP of South Korean girl group Fromis 9. The mini-album was released on September 16, 2020. The physical version of the EP is available in two versions: "My Account" and "My Society". Both consists of the same five tracks, including the lead single "Feel Good (Secret Code)". Off The Record Entertainment announced that Lee Seoyeon would not be able to participate in the promotions for My Little Society due to a leg injury on September 10, 2020.

Background and release 
On August 25, 2020, Off The Record Entertainment confirmed that fromis_9 will make a comeback on September 14, making it their first comeback after a year and three months since their last one. On September 2, Off The Record announced that fromis_9 would release their third EP with the name My Little Society on September 16, two days from the previously confirmed date.

On September 3-5, they released the first set of the concept photos for My Little Society. Then, on September 6-8, they released the second set of the concept photos. The next day, on September 9, they released some group concept photos. On September 11-12, they released the tracklist and the highlight medley for My Little Society respectively, revealing "Feel Good (Secret Code)" as the lead single. On September 15-16, they released the first and second music video teasers for "Feel Good (Secret Code)" respectively.

On September 16, they released My Little Society along with the music video for "Feel Good (Secret Code)".

Promotion 
They held their first live performance for "Feel Good (Secret Code)" on September 16, 2020 on Mnet's M Countdown. Then, they continue to perform "Feel Good (Secret Code)" on other music shows, including  MBC's Show! Music Core, SBS's Inkigayo, and SBS MTV's The Show.

Track listing 
Credits adapted from Melon.

Charts

Weekly

Monthly

Release history

References 

2020 EPs
Fromis 9 EPs
Korean-language EPs
Hybe Corporation EPs